Sweet Lou is an album by jazz saxophonist Lou Donaldson, his final recorded for the Blue Note label, featuring Donaldson with a big band arranged and conducted by Horace Ott.

The album was awarded 3 stars in an Allmusic review by Eugene Chadbourne who stated "the passing of time has been in some ways been kind to these efforts, blurring the original impression given of careers headed downhill. Donaldson's tone on alto saxophone, regardless of setting, sounds like Charlie Parker after he has spent the night stuffed into one of those jars of pickled eggs on the menu in particularly hardcore bars".

Track listing
All compositions by Lou Donaldson except as indicated
 "You're Welcome, Stop On By" (Bobby Womack) - 3:55
 "Lost Love" - 5:49
 "Hip Trip" (Horace Ott) - 6:28
 "If You Can't Handle It, Give It To Me"  (Horace Ott)- 3:53
 "Love Eyes" (Horace Ott) - 3:55
 "Peepin'" (Lonnie Smith) - 6:14
 "Herman's Mambo" (Herman Foster) - 4:36
Recorded at Generation Sound Studios, NYC on March 14 (tracks 3-5), March 19 (tracks 2, 6 & 7) and March 21 (track 1), 1974.

Personnel
Lou Donaldson - varitone alto saxophone
Ernie Royal, Joe Shepley, Danny Moore - trumpet
Garnett Brown - trombone
Seldon Powell, Arthur Clarke - tenor saxophone, flute
Buddy Lucas - harmonica
Horace Ott - keyboards, synthesizer, arranger, conductor
Paul Griffin - clavinet
Hugh McCracken, David Spinozza, Cornell Dupree - electric guitar
Wilbur Bascomb - electric bass
Bernard Purdie, Jimmy Young - drums
Unknown - percussion
Barbara Massey, Hilda Harris, Eileen Gilbert, Carl Williams Jr., William Sample, Bill Davis, Eric Figueroa - vocals

References

Lou Donaldson albums
1974 albums
Blue Note Records albums
Albums conducted by Horace Ott
Albums arranged by Horace Ott
Albums produced by George Butler (record producer)